Scognamiglio is an Italian surname. Notable people with the surname include:

 Carlo Scognamiglio (born 1944), Italian economist and politician
 Carlo Scognamiglio (cyclist) (born 1983), Italian cyclist
 Gennaro Scognamiglio (born 1987), Italian footballer
 Vincenzo Scognamiglio (1920–1992), better known as Vincent Gardenia, Italian-American actor

Italian-language surnames